Bloodwork is the first EP by American horror punk musician Wednesday 13 The band struggled to come to a conclusion as to whether the EP would receive a CD release or if it would stay download only for the time being. On June 4, 2008, a decision was reached and was posted on the band's Myspace blog  "The Bloodwork EP, which is currently available for download on Itunes and Amazon, will be available for sale as a physical cd during the U.S. tour starting on July 1, 2008."
Bloodwork was sold during the US and UK 2008 tours, and though once stated to be a tour exclusive, the EP was officially released online on January 22, 2009.

The EP features six tracks, including two unreleased songs, a Tom Petty and the Heartbreakers cover, the 4th re-recording of a song by Wednesday 13's former band Frankenstein Drag Queens from Planet 13, and acoustic renditions of two songs from 13's Skeletons album, "My Demise" and "Skeletons".

When asked about the re-recording of "I Love to Say Fuck" Wednesday 13 stated that many fans could not find this track, so he recorded it to make it once again easily available to the masses.

Track listing

Personnel
Wednesday 13 - vocals, guitars
Nate Manor - bass
Racci Shay - drums
Jamie Hoover - guitars, piano

References

2008 EPs
Wednesday 13 albums
Horror punk EPs